The insect tribe Stromboscerini is part of the weevil family Curculionidae, subfamily Dryophthorinae. It is a small and little-known weevil group. Alonso-Zarazaga & Lyal (1999) treated it as a subfamily (Stromboscerinae Lacordaire, 1866).

All weevils of this tribe have the antennal club with an asymmetrical apex. The winged species of the tribe have the eyes contiguous beneath the head, which makes them "Cyclops"-like. This characteristic is seen in some other Dryophthorinae. All other weevils with contiguous eyes have them connected at the upper part of the head, as in Zygops (Conoderinae) or some Rhamphini (Curculioninae).

References 

 Faust J. 1894. Viaggio di Leonardo Fea in Birmania e regioni vicine. LX. Curculionidae. Annali del’Museo Civico di storia Naturale di Genova. 34: 153-370
 He, T.L., Zhang, R.Z., Pelsue, F.W. 2003. A new species of the genus Allaeotes Pascoe from China (Coleoptera: Curculionidae: Dryophthorinae). Coleopterists Bulletin 57 (2): 127-131 
 He, T.L., Zhang, R.Z., Pelsue, F.W. 2003. A new species of the genus Synommatoides Morimoto from China (Coleoptera: Curculionidae: Dryophthorinae). Coleopterists Bulletin 57 (2): 123-126 
 Morimoto K. 1978. Check-list of the family Rhynchophoridae (Coleoptera) of Japan, with descriptions of a new genus and five new species. Esakia (12):103-118
 Morimoto K. 1985. Supplement to the check-list of the family Rhynchophoridae (Coleoptera) of Japan, with descriptions of a new genus and four new species. Esakia (23):67-76
 Riedel, A. 1995. A new Besuchetiella Osella (Coleoptera: Curculionoidea: Rhynchophoridae) from Sumatra. Coleopterists Bulletin 49 (3): 293-299
 Roelofs W. 1872. Diagnoses de nouvelles espéces de Curculionides, Brenthides, Anthribides et Bruchides du Japon. Annales de la Société Entomologique de Belgique. Comptes-Rendus. 22: LIII-LV
 Alonso-Zarazaga, M. A. & Lyal, C.H.C. 1999. A world catalogue of families and genera of Curculionoidea (Insecta: Coleoptera) (Excepting Scolytidae and Platypodidae). Entomopraxis, SCP Edition, Barcelona
 Zherikhin V. V. 2000. Tertiary brachycerid weevils (Coleoptera: Brachyceridae) from the collections of Muséum Nationale d’Histoire Naturelle, Paris, with a review of other fossil Brachyceridae. Paleontological Journal 34, Suppl. 3: S333-S343
 http://www.coleoptera.org/p1518.htm

Dryophthorinae
Polyphaga tribes